}}
Tim Deavin (born 27 July 1984) is an Australian field hockey player. He plays for the Kookaburras, the Australian men's Hockey Team. He first played for the Australian senior national team in 2010.

Personal
Deavin is from Tasmania. He attended Scotch Oakburn College. In 2010, he was asked to move to Perth, Western Australia, to join the Kookaburras.
In 2014, Deavin was banned from playing with his team, Tamar Churinga, in Tasmania's Greater Northern Hockey League when another team had put in a complaint about his professional performance and how it was going to jeopardize the opposing team's ladder position.
Deavin defied his ban just weeks later when he played in a charity match against the Queechy Penguins.

Field hockey
Deavin plays now predominantly at the back as a defender, but can and has played centre-half, midfield and striker for the Kookaburras.

Club hockey
Tim Started his playing career playing at Scotch Oakburn College and Tamar Churinga Hockey Club in Launceston. He then moved to Hobart where he still occasionally plays for the Derwent Strikers in the Southern Men's Hockey League. In 2008 and 2009 he won the league's men's best and fairest hockey award. In 2010, he was with the team, playing for them in the grand final.
Deavin played for Doncaster in the English national League in the 05/06 season, where he won the Player of the League. He also has played in the New Zealand national league for Southern (Otago) in 2006 and Midlands in 2012 and 2014 (when they were league runners up), he won MVP for the tournament. Tim also played for Kuala Lumpur Hockey Club in the Malaysian National League in 2013 and won the championship.

State team
Deavin plays for the Tassie Tigers in the Australian Hockey League(2014 Champions). He was with the team in 2008, 2010 and 2011. He had a severe foot injury in 2011 that kept him away from Tassie Tigers in the Australian Hockey League.

National team
Deavin made his national team debut in 2010. In 2010 and 2011, he won a gold medal at the Champions Trophys in Germany and New Zealand. He Played in the Sultan Azlan Shah Cup in Malaysia in 2010(3rd), 2011(1st) and 2013(1st) where he was named in the Azlan Shah Cup Eleven. In December 2011, he was named as one of twenty-eight players to be on the 2012 Summer Olympics Australian men's national training squad. In February 2012 he played in a four nations test series with the teams being the Kookaburras, Australia A Squad, the Netherlands and Argentina, where Australia won. He played in the London Olympics where the team won bronze. At the 2014 Hockey World Cup, Deavin and the Kookaburras won back to back golds at The Hague in the Netherlands.

References

External links
 
 
 

1984 births
Living people
Australian male field hockey players
Olympic field hockey players of Australia
Olympic bronze medalists for Australia
Olympic medalists in field hockey
Field hockey players at the 2012 Summer Olympics
Field hockey players at the 2016 Summer Olympics
Medalists at the 2012 Summer Olympics
2014 Men's Hockey World Cup players